Mudrovce is a village and municipality in Košice-okolie District in the Kosice Region of eastern Slovakia.

History
In historical records the village was first mentioned in 1406.

Geography
The village lies at an altitude of 410 metres and covers an area of 5.889 km². The municipality has a population of only 84 people.

External links

Villages and municipalities in Košice-okolie District
Šariš